Hong Seok-han (born 18 December 1975) is a South Korean cyclist. He competed at the 1996 Summer Olympics and the 2004 Summer Olympics.

References

1975 births
Living people
South Korean male cyclists
Olympic cyclists of South Korea
Cyclists at the 1996 Summer Olympics
Cyclists at the 2004 Summer Olympics
Place of birth missing (living people)
Asian Games medalists in cycling
Asian Games gold medalists for South Korea
Asian Games silver medalists for South Korea
Cyclists at the 1994 Asian Games
Cyclists at the 1998 Asian Games
Medalists at the 1994 Asian Games
Medalists at the 1998 Asian Games
20th-century South Korean people
21st-century South Korean people